Kimiko Date was the defending champion and successfully defended her title, by defeating Stephanie Rottier 6–1, 6–3 in the final.

Seeds

Draw

Finals

Top half

Bottom half

References

External links
 Official results archive (ITF)
 Official results archive (WTA)

Tokyo Singles